Kleppen is a suburb of Namsos in Nord-Trøndelag, Norway. It lies around 2 kilometres north-northeast of Namsos centre and borders the suburbs of Fossbrenna, Bjørum, Østbyen, Rønningåsen and Høknes. The area is named after the small farm of Kleppen, which then gave its name to the suburb.

In the suburb are Høknes primary school, Kleppen sports club from 1959  has two sports halls and football pitches, including Kleppen stadium, where Namsos IL play their home games. In a former shelter in the mountains is the swimming club "Oasen".

References 

Nord-Trøndelag